Dolra is a valley glacier located on the southern slopes of the Greater Caucasus Mountain Range in the Svaneti Region of Georgia. The glacier is the source of the river Dolraschala.

See also
Glaciers of Georgia

References 
 Georgian State (Soviet) Encyclopedia. 1975. Book 3. p. 611.

Glaciers of Georgia (country)
Svaneti